Elizabeth Jeffreys FAHA (born 22 July 1941) was Bywater and Sotheby Professor of Byzantine and Modern Greek Language and Literature, University of Oxford, and Fellow of Exeter College, Oxford, 1996–2006. She is now Emeritus Professor, and Emeritus Fellow of Exeter College.

Career

Elizabeth Jeffreys was educated at Blackheath High School and Girton College, Cambridge. Later in her career she gained a Bachelor of Letters (BLitt) degree from St Anne's College, Oxford.

Jeffreys taught at Mary Datchelor Girls' School (now closed), London, 1965–69, then became senior resident fellow at the Warburg Institute, University of London, 1969–72. She was a visiting fellow at the Dumbarton Oaks Center for Byzantine Studies, 1972–74, then resident fellow at the University of Ioannina, 1974–76. She then moved to Australia as lecturer at universities in Sydney, Australia, 1976–86; Resident Fellow, University of Melbourne, 1987–89; and resident fellow then senior resident fellow, University of Sydney, 1990–95, before returning to Oxford as fellow and professor. After retiring she held a Leverhulme Emeritus Fellowship 2008–09.

Jeffreys is a Fellow of the Australian Academy of the Humanities and honorary Fellow of St Anne's College, Oxford.

Publications

 Byzantine Papers, proceedings of the First Australian Byzantine Studies Conference, Canberra, May 1978 (ed. with Michael Jeffreys and Ann Moffatt), Australian National University, 1981. 
 Popular literature in late Byzantium: collected papers (with Michael Jeffreys), Variorum Reprints, 1983. 
 The Chronicle of John Malalas (tr. with Michael Jeffreys and Roger Scott), Australian Association for Byzantine Studies, 1986. 
 Studies in John Malalas (ed. with Brian Croke and Roger Scott), Australian Association for Byzantine Studies, 1990. 
 Ho Polemos tes Troados (The War of Troy) (with Manolis Papathomopoulos), National Bank of Greece Cultural Foundation, 1996; 
 Digenis Akritis: the Grottaferrata and Escorial versions (ed. and tr.), Cambridge University Press, 1998. 
 Through the looking glass: Byzantium through British eyes, papers from the twenty-ninth Spring Symposium of Byzantine Studies, London, March 1995 (ed. with Robin Cormack), Ashgate, 2000. 
 Rhetoric in Byzantium, papers from the thirty-fifth Spring Symposium of Byzantine Studies, Exeter College, Oxford, March 2001 (ed.), Ashgate, 2003. 
 Byzantine style, religion, and civilisation: in honour of Sir Steven Runciman, Cambridge University Press, 2006. 
 The age of the dromon: the Byzantine navy ca. 500–1204, with John Pryor (appendix translated by Ahmad Shboul), Brill Academic Publishers, 2006. 
Oxford Handbook of Byzantine Studies, with Robin Cormack and John Haldon, Oxford University Press, 2008. 
 Iacobi Monachi Epistulae (Letters of the monk Jacob), Brepols, 2009. 
 Four Byzantine novels (translated from the Ancient Greek), Liverpool University Press, 2012.

References
 JEFFREYS, Prof. Elizabeth Mary, Who's Who 2012, A & C Black, 2012; online edn, Oxford University Press, Dec 2011. Retrieved 9 February 2012 
 Prof Elizabeth Jeffreys, Debrett's People Online
 Professor E.M. Jeffreys, Oxford University Faculty of Medieval and Modern Languages (retired postholders)
 Elizabeth Jeffreys , Oxford Centre for Late Antiquity
 Jeffreys, Elizabeth, FAHA, Australian Academy of the Humanities

External links 
 Professor E.M. Jeffreys, Oxford University Faculty of Medieval and Modern Languages

1941 births
Alumni of Girton College, Cambridge
Alumni of St Anne's College, Oxford
British Byzantinists
Fellows of Exeter College, Oxford
Fellows of St Anne's College, Oxford
Fellows of the Australian Academy of the Humanities
Living people
Academics of the Warburg Institute
People educated at Blackheath High School
Statutory Professors of the University of Oxford
Scholars of Medieval Greek
Academic staff of the University of Sydney
British classical scholars
Women classical scholars
Scholars of Byzantine literature
Women Byzantinists
Women medievalists